Stockstreet is a hamlet on the A120 road to the west of the town of Coggeshall in Braintree District, Essex, England

Hamlets in Essex
Braintree District